Dark Clouds Gather is an adventure module published in 1985 for the Advanced Dungeons & Dragons fantasy role-playing game.

Plot summary
Dark Clouds Gather is an adventure which involves combat between creatures in the air, and an attack on the flying home of a cloud giant.

Publication history
UK7 Dark Clouds Gather was written by Jim Bambra and Phil Gallagher, with art by Brian Williams, and was published by TSR in 1985 as a 32-page booklet with an outer folder.

Reception
Lawrence Schick, in his 1991 book Heroic Worlds, recommends this scenario for experienced DM's and "players with a good grasp of the rules".

Reviews
Review: The V.I.P. of Gaming Magazine #2 (1986)

References

Dungeons & Dragons modules
Role-playing game supplements introduced in 1985